Elongation of very long chain fatty acids protein 5 is a protein that in humans is encoded by the ELOVL5 gene.

References

Further reading